Osveta Crnog Gonzalesa is the fourth album by the Serbian punk rock band Atheist Rap, released by Multimedia Records in 2005.

Track listing

Personnel 
 Leki (Zoran Lekić; bass, backing vocals, acoustic guitar)
 Atzke (Aleksandar Milovanov; drums)
 Dulles (Dušan Ječmenica; guitar)
 Radule (Vladimir Radusinović; guitar, bass vocals)
 Dr. Pop (Aleksandar Popov; vocals)
 Max Power (recorded by, mixed by)
 Pedericco Rashiid (Vladimir Radusinović; mixed by)

External links 
 EX YU ROCK enciklopedija 1960-2006, Janjatović Petar; 
 Osveta Crnog Gonzalesa at Discogs
 Official site discography page

Atheist Rap albums
2005 albums